Vojislav is a Serbian masculine given name, a Slavic dithematic name (of two lexemes), derived from the Slavic words voj ("war, warrior"), and slava ("glory, fame"), which both are very common in Slavic names. Its feminine form is Vojislava. It may refer to:

Stefan Vojislav (fl. 1034–43), Serbian ruler
Vojislav Brajović (born 1949), Serbian actor
Vojislav Đonović (1921–2008), Serbian jazz guitarist
Vojislav Ilić (1860–1894), Serbian poet
Vojislav Jovanović Marambo, Serbian university professor and diplomat
Vojislav V. Jovanović, Serbian writer
Vojislav Koštunica (b. 1944), Serbian politician
Vojislav Melić (1940–2006), Yugoslav footballer
Vojislav Mihailović (born 1951), Serbian politician
Vojislav Nikčević (1935–2007), Montenegrin linguist
Vojislav Šešelj (b. 1954), Serbian politician
Vojislav Vranjković (b. 1983), Serbian footballer
Vojislav Vukčević (b. 1938), retired Serbian politician

See also

Vojislavljević dynasty

Slavic masculine given names
Serbian masculine given names